is a railway station in the city of Kushiro in Hokkaido, Japan, operated by the Hokkaido Railway Company (JR Hokkaido).

Lines
Senmō Main Line trains from  also terminate here.

Adjacent stations

References

External links

 Kushiro Station (JR Hokkaido) 

Railway stations in Hokkaido Prefecture
Railway stations in Japan opened in 1901